Mikhail Alexandrovich Ulyanov (20 November 1927 – 26 March 2007) was a Soviet and Russian actor who was one of the most recognized persons of the post-World War II Soviet theatre and cinema. He was named a People's Artist of the USSR in 1969 and a Hero of Socialist Labour in 1986 and received a special prize from the Venice Film Festival in 1982.

Biography
Mikhail Alexandrovich Ulyanov spent his childhood and youth in the town of Tara, Omsk Oblast. Although he had failed his exams in Schepkinskoe School and for the Moscow Art Theatre School, he moved to Omsk in 1944 to become an actor. After two years of studies in the studio at Omsk Drama he went to Moscow and entered the Schukin Theatre School in 1946.

Ulyanov worked in the Vakhtangov Theatre from 1950 and directed it from 1987. He played a wide range of characters on stage, with Rogozhin in Dostoevsky’s Idiot being the most remarkable of them. In 1979 he staged Vasily Shukshin’s epic novel I have come to give you freedom, where he starred as Stepan Razin. In 1985 Mikhail Ulyanov staged the satirical pamphlet The Child Buyer by the American playwright John Hersey.

As regards movies, he was frequently cast in the parts of staunch Communist leaders like Vladimir Lenin and Marshal Zhukov. His well-known character Yegor Trubnikov in Predsedatel (Chairman) (1964) became a Soviet classic and his most emblematic role.

The Brothers Karamazov, a 1969 film he co-directed, was nominated for the Academy Award for Best Foreign Language Film and was entered into the 6th Moscow International Film Festival. He also starred in Tema (1979) and Private Life (1982), the films that won top awards at the Berlin Film Festival and Venice Film Festival, respectively.

More recently, he was acclaimed for the roles of Julius Caesar in the screening of Shakespeare's play (1990), Pontius Pilate in the film adaptation of The Master and Margarita (1994), and an avenging veteran marksman in The Rifleman of the Voroshilov Regiment (1999), directed by Stanislav Govorukhin. He died on March 26, 2007 of intestinal disease.

Selected filmography

 Oni byli pervymi (1956) as Aleksey Kolyvanov
 Ekaterina Voronina (1957) as Sutyrin
 The House I Live In (1957) as Dmitry Fedorovich Kashirin
 Volunteers (1958)
 Shli soldaty (1958)
 Gorod na zare (1959) as Belous
 Stuchis' v lyubuyu dver''' (1959)
 A Simple Story (1960) as Andrey Egorovich Danilov
 Baltiyskoe nebo (1961) as Rassokhin
 Bitva v puti (1961) as Dmitriy Bakhiryev
 Molodo-zeleno (1962) as Lizlov
 Eto sluchilos v militsii (1963) (voice)
 Silence (1964) as Pyotr Ivanovich Bykov
 The Alive and the Dead (1964) as Sergei Filippovich, Army Commander
 The Chairman (1964) as Yegor Trubnikov
 Solange Leben in mir ist (1965) as Frolow
 Frozen Flashes (1967) as general Alexander Gorbatov
 The Brothers Karamazov (1969) as Dmitri Karamazov
 Unterwegs zu Lenin (1969) as Lenin
 Liberation (1969-1971, part 1-5) as Marshall Georgy Konstantinovitch Zhukov
 The Flight (1970) as general Gregory Lukyanovich Charnota
 Anflug Alpha I (1971) as General Arkatow
 Trotz alledem! (1972) as Lenin
 More v ogne (1972) as Georgiy Zhukov
 Yegor Bulychyov i drugiye (1972) as Yegor Bulychov
 Samyy posledniy den (1973) as Semyon Kolvalyov
 Blokada (1974, 1977, part 1, 2) as Zhukov
 Take Aim (1975) as marshal Georgy Zhukov
 Legenda o Tile (1977) as Klaas
 Soldiers of Freedom (1977, TV Mini-Series) as marshal Georgy Zhukov
 Pozovi menya v dal svetluyu (1978) as Nikolay
 Obratnaya svyaz (1978) as Ignat Maksimovich Nurkov
 The Theme (1979) as Kim Yesenin, writer
 Posledniy pobeg (1981) as Kustov
 Fevralskiy veter (1981)
 Fakty minuvshego dnya (1981)
 Private Life (1982) as Sergei Nikitich Abrikosov
 Without Witness (1983) as He
 Esli vrag ne sdayotsya... (1983) as Marshall Georgiy Zhukov
 Den komandira divizii (1983) as Zhukov
 Pobeda (1985) as Zhukov
 Marshal Zhukov, stranitsy biografii (1985)
 Battle of Moscow (1985) as marshal Georgy Zhukov
 Vybor (1988) as Vladimir Vasilyev
 Zakon (1989) as Zhukov
 Nash bronepoyezd (1989)
 Stalingrad (1990) as marshal Georgy Zhukov
 Dom pod zvyozdnym nebom (1991) as Bashkirtsev Andrey Nikolaevich, academician
 Sam ya - vyatskiy urozhenets (1992) as Alexandr Kirpikov
 Kooperativ Politbyuro ili budet dolgim proshchanie (1992)
 Everything Will Be Fine! (1995) as Grandpa
 Velikiy polkovodets Georgiy Zhukov (1995) as Georgi Zhukov
 Tayna Marchello (1997)
 Sochinenie ko Dnyu Pobedy (1998) as Dyakov
 The Rifleman of the Voroshilov Regiment (1999) as Ivan Fyodorovich Afonin
 Severnoe siyanie (2001) as Old man in the country house
 Antikiller (2002) as Father, criminal boss
 The Master and Margarita'' (2006) as Pontius Pilate (final film role)

Honours and awards
Ulyanov has won the following awards:
 Hero of Socialist Labour (1986)
 Order of Merit for the Fatherland, 3rd class (17 October 1996) - For services to the state and an outstanding contribution to theatrical art
 Two Orders of Lenin (1986, ?)
 Order of the October Revolution (1977)
 Lenin Prize (1966) - for his performance as Yegor Ivanovich Trubnikov in the feature film "The Chairman"
 RSFSR State Prize, Stanislavsky (1975) - for his role in the play Druyanova "Day in and day out," AL Veytslera and A. Misharin
 USSR State Prize (1983) - for playing Sergei Nikitich Abrikosov in the movie "Private Lives" (1982)
 People's Artist of the RSFSR (1965)
 People's Artist of the USSR (1969)
 Honoured Worker of Culture of the Polish People's Republic (1974)
 "Golden Lion" (Venice Film Festival, 1982) for starring in the movie "Private Lives"
 Order "For honour and valour" - for service to the Russian people and the badge "Golden Olympus" (2005)
 Sole honorary title of "Superstar" (2005)
 Kinotavr Award nomination for "Prize for creative careers" (1997)
 Award "Golden Aries" in 1999 for "Best Actor"
 Russian Federation President Prize in Literature and Art in 1998
 Crystal Turandot Award (1997)
 Golden Mask (1999)
 Award "Idol" (1999)
 In 2008, Russia's new arctic oil tanker has been named "Mikhail Ulyanov"

References

External links

  Biography
 Mikhail Ulyanov at the Vakhtangov Theatre website
 Actor Mikhail Ulyanov died in Moscow 
 
 

1927 births
2007 deaths
People from Muromtsevsky District
Burials at Novodevichy Cemetery
Soviet male actors
Russian male actors
Soviet film directors
Deaths from digestive disease
Recipients of the Order "For Merit to the Fatherland", 3rd class
Lenin Prize winners
People's Artists of the USSR
Heroes of Socialist Labour
Recipients of the Order of Lenin
Recipients of the USSR State Prize
People's Artists of Russia
Recipient of the Meritorious Activist of Culture badge